Ordinary Seaman James K. L. Duncan (July 6, 1845 to March 27, 1913) was an American sailor who fought in the American Civil War. He was honored with the award on 31 December 1864.

Biography
Duncan was born in Frankfort Mineral Springs, Pennsylvania on July 6, 1845. Duncan attended Monmouth College with the class of 1866 but did not return to college after leaving to join the Civil War fighting for the north. He enlisted into the U.S. Navy on June 26, 1863 in Chicago, Illinois. He was assigned to the tinclad steamer USS Fort Hindman at the time of his Medal of Honor action in March 1864. He was mustered out of service on July 8, 1864 in Red River, Louisiana. He reenlisted on March 4, 1865 and was discharged on July 13, 1866 in Pensacola, Florida. He was married to Lillian J. Duncan. In civilian life he had a career as a physician. He was admitted to the Northwestern Branch Soldiers Home on May 2, 1910. He died on March 27, 1913 and his remains are interred at the Wood National Cemetery in Wisconsin.

Medal of Honor citation

See also

List of American Civil War Medal of Honor recipients: A–F

References

1845 births
1913 deaths
People of Pennsylvania in the American Civil War
Union Navy officers
United States Navy Medal of Honor recipients
American Civil War recipients of the Medal of Honor
Monmouth College alumni